Flight Lieutenant Amy Victoria Fiona Cokayne (born 11 July 1996) is an English rugby union player. She made her international debut for England in 2015 against Italy. She was named in the 2017 Women's Rugby World Cup squad for England.

International career 
Though her family moved to New Zealand when she was nine, Cokayne made the choice to train for England after being called up to the New Zealand Women's Rugby Team (known as the Black Ferns) training camp; she moved back to England in 2013. 

The following year she was selected for the England Under 20s team, and made her first appearance for the seniors England Women's Rugby Team in 2015. She scored her first senior try for the side against Canada in the 2015 Super Series.

Cokayne went on to play in every game in the 2017 Women's Rugby World Cup and was named the second highest try-scorer in the 2017 Women's Six Nations Championship.

In 2019 she was awarded a full time contract with the England team. She missed some games that year, including the 2019 Super Series, as she completed her RAF training. She was named in the England squad for the delayed 2021 Rugby World Cup held in New Zealand in October and November 2022.

Club career 
After returning to England, Cokayne joined Lichfield Ladies in 2014. In 2017 she moved to Wasps, before joining Harlequins Women in 2019.

Early life and education 
Born in Ipswich, Cokayne first played rugby at age six, at Cleve Rugby Club in Bristol. She also played football as goal keeper for Aston Villa Under 10s. Cokayne's father was a big Aston Villa fan: her initials spell out AVFC.

She was nine when her family migrated to New Zealand in 2006 because her father joined the Royal New Zealand Air Force. She attended Feilding High School and captained the girls rugby team in 2012, winning 53 consecutive matches.

Cokayne studied for a Bachelor of Science degree in Sports Science at Loughborough college.

In December 2018, Cokayne graduated as a pilot officer in the RAF. She went on to train for the RAF Police.

References

External links 

 RFU Player Profile

1996 births
Living people
England women's international rugby union players
English female rugby union players
Female rugby union players
Rugby union players from Ipswich
21st-century Royal Air Force personnel
Military personnel from Ipswich